The Jack  Fire is a large wildfire that started near Glide, Oregon on June 16, 2021. It has so far burned  and is 35% contained.

Events

July 
The Jack Fire was first reported on July 5, 2021 at around 2:00 pm PDT near Glide, Oregon.

Cause 
The cause of the fire is currently unknown.

Containment 
As of July 21, 2021, the fire is 55% percent contained.

References 

2021 Oregon wildfires
July 2021 events in the United States
Wildfires in Oregon